The Life Amplified World Tour was the eleventh headlining concert tour by American country music singer Brad Paisley. It began on May 19, 2016, in Wheatland, California and concluded on February 18, 2017, in Verona, New York, The tour played through amphitheaters and festivals across the United States and Canada.

Background
The tour was first announced in May 2016, through Paisley's website. Opening up for Paisley for most of the dates was Tyler Farr and Maddie & Tae. The second North American leg was announced in December 2016. Paisley also brought the tour to the UK, returning to headline the 2017 C2C: Country to Country festival in London, Glasgow and Dublin after cancelling two proposed dates at London's O2 Arena in July 2016.

Concert synopsis
Paisley performs his past hits, and his new single, "Without a Fight". During "Without a Fight", his collaboration with Demi Lovato, there is video of Lovato in the recording studio that is played alongside. Lovato did make a surprise appearance in Irvine, California on May 20, 2016.

Opening acts

Leg 1
Brandy Clark
Tyler Farr
Brett Kissel
Chris Lane
Maddie & Tae
Chris Young

Leg 2
Chase Bryant
Lindsay Ell

Setlist
The current setlist is as follows:

"The World"
"Water"/"Perfect Storm"
"Country Nation"
"This Is Country Music"
"Crushin' It / I'm Still a Guy" 
"She's Everything"
"American Saturday Night"
"Celebrity"
"Old Alabama"
"Then"
"Beat This Summer" 
"Ticks"
"I'm Gonna Miss Her (The Fishin' Song)"
"Letter to Me"
"Ashamed of Your Selfie"
"Southern Comfort Zone"
"Without a Fight"
"Online"
"Mud on the Tires'''"
Encore
"River Bank"
"Alcohol"

Tour dates

Notes
Festivals and fairs

Cancelled shows
The Pepsi Gulf Coast Jam in Panama City on September 2, 2016, was cancelled due to Hurricane Hermine.

Critical reception
Michael James Rocha of The San Diego Union-Tribune says that Paisley was "still crushin' it" and for his performance, "Vocally, he is solid, though there were moments Saturday when he seemed somewhat disengaged — as if he was merely going through the motions. But musically, when he was one with his guitar, it was magical."

References

2016 concert tours
Brad Paisley concert tours